Arthur Bishop may refer to: 

 Arthur Bishop (cricketer) (1863–1931), English cricketer
 Arthur Ernest Bishop (1917–2006), Australian engineer and inventor
 Arthur Gary Bishop (1952–1988), convicted American child molester and serial killer
 Arthur Bishop, protagonist in the 1972 film The Mechanic, and its remakes